Tomberlin (formerly Haberton) is an unincorporated community in Indian Bayou Township, Lonoke County, Arkansas, United States. It is located along Highway 31 at an intersection with Tar Bottom Road. Just north of Tomberlin is the Walls Farm Barn and Corn Crib, listed on the National Register of Historic Places.

References

Unincorporated communities in Lonoke County, Arkansas
Unincorporated communities in Arkansas